Yendrick Alberto Ruiz González (San José, Costa Rica, 4 December 1987) is a Costa Rican professional football player who plays as a forward for Liga FPD club Herediano. He is the younger brother of footballer Bryan Ruiz.

He made his international debut for Costa Rica on May 28, 2013, in a friendly against Canada.

Honours
Herediano
Liga FPD: Clausura 2013, Clausura 2015, Clausura 2016, Apertura 2018, Apertura 2019
CONCACAF League: 2018

Individual
Liga FPD Top Scorer: 2014–15 Invierno, 2015–16 Verano, 2016–17 Invierno
CONCACAF League Golden Ball: 2018
CONCACAF League Golden Boot (Shared): 2018

References

External links
 

1987 births
Living people
Costa Rican footballers
L.D. Alajuelense footballers
Puntarenas F.C. players
C.S. Herediano footballers
FC Pune City players
Yendrick Ruiz
Oriente Petrolero players
Liga FPD players
Indian Super League players
Yendrick Ruiz
Expatriate footballers in India
Expatriate footballers in Thailand
Expatriate footballers in Bolivia
Costa Rican expatriate sportspeople in India
Costa Rican expatriate sportspeople in Thailand
Costa Rican expatriate sportspeople in Bolivia
Costa Rican expatriate footballers
Costa Rica international footballers
Footballers from San José, Costa Rica
Association football forwards
2013 CONCACAF Gold Cup players